The 2020 College Football All-America Team includes those players of American college football who have been honored by various selector organizations as the best players at their respective positions.  The selector organizations award the "All-America" honor annually following the conclusion of the fall college football season.  The original All-America team was the 1889 College Football All-America Team selected by Caspar Whitney and Walter Camp. The National Collegiate Athletic Bureau, which is the National Collegiate Athletic Association's (NCAA) service bureau, compiled, in the 1950, the first list of All-Americans including first-team selections on teams created for a national audience that received national circulation with the intent of recognizing selections made from viewpoints that were nationwide.  Since 1957, College Sports Information Directors of America (CoSIDA) has bestowed Academic All-American recognition on male and female athletes in Divisions I, II, and III of the NCAA as well as National Association of Intercollegiate Athletics athletes, including all NCAA championship sports.

The 2020 College Football All-America Team is composed of the following College Football All-American first teams chosen by the following selector organizations: Associated Press (AP), Football Writers Association of America (FWAA), American Football Coaches Association (AFCA), Walter Camp Foundation (WCFF), Sporting News (TSN, from its historic name of The Sporting News), Sports Illustrated (SI), The Athletic (Athletic), USA Today (USAT) ESPN, CBS Sports (CBS), College Football News (CFN), Scout.com, Athlon Sports, Phil Steele, and Fox Sports (FOX).

Currently, the NCAA compiles consensus all-America teams in the sports of Division I FBS football and Division I men's basketball using a point system computed from All-America teams named by coaches associations or media sources.  Players are chosen against other players playing at their position only.  To be selected a consensus All-American, players must be chosen to the first team on at least half of the five official selectors as recognized by the NCAA.  Second- and third-team honors are used to break ties.  Players named first-team by all five selectors are deemed unanimous All-Americans. Currently, the NCAA recognizes All-Americans selected by the AP, AFCA, FWAA, TSN, and the WCFF to determine consensus and unanimous All-Americans.

Twenty-eight players were recognized as consensus All-Americans for 2020, thirteen of them unanimously. Unanimous selections are followed by an asterisk (*)

Offense

Quarterback
Mac Jones, Alabama (AFCA, AP, Athletic, ESPN, TSN, USAT, WCFF)
Trevor Lawrence, Clemson (FWAA, Phil Steele)
Kyle Trask, Florida (CBS)

Running back
Breece Hall, Iowa State (AFCA, AP, Athletic, CBS, ESPN, FWAA, Phil Steele, TSN, USAT, WCFF)
Najee Harris, Alabama (AFCA, AP, CBS, ESPN, FWAA, Phil Steele, TSN, WCFF)
Jaret Patterson, Buffalo (Athletic, USAT)

Wide receiver
Jaelon Darden, North Texas (ESPN, FWAA, Phil Steele, USAT)
Elijah Moore, Ole Miss (AFCA, AP, Athletic, CBS, Phil Steele, TSN, WCFF)
DeVonta Smith, Alabama (AFCA, AP, Athletic, CBS, ESPN, FWAA, Phil Steele, TSN, USAT, WCFF)

Tight end
Kyle Pitts, Florida (AFCA, AP, Athletic, CBS, ESPN, FWAA, Phil Steele, TSN, USAT, WCFF)

Offensive line
Aaron Banks, Notre Dame (AFCA, AP, ESPN, USAT)
Brady Christensen, BYU (AP, CBS, ESPN, USAT, WCFF)
Christian Darrisaw, Virginia Tech (CBS)
Wyatt Davis, Ohio State (AFCA, AP, ESPN, FWAA, Phil Steele, TSN, WCFF)
Landon Dickerson, Alabama (AFCA, AP, CBS, ESPN, FWAA, Phil Steele, TSN, WCFF)
Liam Eichenberg, Notre Dame (AFCA, Athletic, CBS, FWAA, Phil Steele, TSN, WCFF)
Kenyon Green, Texas A&M (Athletic, FWAA, Phil Steele, TSN)
Alex Leatherwood, Alabama (AFCA, AP, Athletic, CBS, ESPN, FWAA, Phil Steele, TSN, USAT, WCFF)
Tyler Linderbaum, Iowa (Athletic, USAT)
Cain Madden, Marshall (Athletic, USAT)

Defense

Defensive line
JaQuan Bailey, Iowa State (FWAA, Phil Steele)
Christian Barmore, Alabama (CBS)
Haskell Garrett, Ohio State (CBS)
Cade Hall, San Jose State (TSN)
Tarron Jackson, Coastal Carolina (AFCA, AP, Athletic, ESPN, FWAA, Phil Steele, WCFF)
Patrick Jones II, Pittsburgh (TSN, WCFF)
Alim McNeill, North Carolina State (Athletic)
Daviyon Nixon, Iowa (AFCA, AP, Athletic, ESPN, FWAA, Phil Steele, TSN, USAT, WCFF)
Jaelan Phillips, Miami (FL) (AFCA, Athletic, CBS, USAT)
Darius Stills, West Virginia (AP, ESPN, TSN, USAT)
Rashad Weaver, Pittsburgh (AFCA, AP, CBS, ESPN, FWAA, Phil Steele, USAT, WCFF)

Linebacker
Zaven Collins, Tulsa (AFCA, AP, Athletic, CBS, ESPN, FWAA, Phil Steele, TSN, USAT, WCFF)
Dylan Moses, Alabama (AFCA)
Joseph Ossai, Texas (AP, CBS, ESPN, FWAA, Phil Steele, WCFF)
Jeremiah Owusu-Koramoah, Notre Dame (AFCA, AP, Athletic, CBS, ESPN, FWAA, Phil Steele, TSN, USAT, WCFF)
Mike Rose, Iowa State (Athletic, Phil Steele, USAT)
Chazz Surratt, North Carolina (TSN)

Defensive back
Sauce Gardner, Cincinnati (FWAA, Phil Steele, USAT)
Kyle Hamilton, Notre Dame (FWAA, Phil Steele)
Talanoa Hufanga, Southern California (AP, Athletic, CBS, ESPN, TSN, USAT, WCFF)
Shemar Jean-Charles, Appalachian State (WCFF)
Brandon Joseph, Northwestern (AFCA, AP, CBS, TSN, USAT, WCFF)
Tiawan Mullen, Indiana (FWAA, Phil Steele)
Greg Newsome II, Northwestern (Athletic)
Trevon Moehrig, TCU (ESPN)
Derek Stingley Jr., LSU (AFCA)
Eric Stokes, Georgia (CBS)
Patrick Surtain II, Alabama (AFCA, AP, Athletic, CBS, ESPN, FWAA, Phil Steele, TSN, USAT, WCFF)
Shaun Wade, Ohio State (AFCA, AP, ESPN, TSN)
James Wiggins, Cincinnati (Athletic)

Special teams

Kicker
José Borregales, Miami (FL) (AFCA, AP, Athletic, FWAA, Phil Steele, TSN, WCFF)
Will Reichard, Alabama (CBS)
Cade York, LSU (ESPN, USAT)

Punter
Pressley Harvin III, Georgia Tech (AFCA, AP, CBS, ESPN, FWAA, Phil Steele, TSN, USAT, WCFF)
Zach Von Rosenberg, LSU (Athletic)

All-purpose / return specialist
Travis Etienne, Clemson (AP, ESPN, FWAA, Phil Steele, TSN)
 Thomas Fletcher, Alabama (Phil Steele)
Jeremiah Haydel, Texas State (ESPN)
Marcus Jones, Houston (CBS, FWAA, Phil Steele)
Chris Smith, Louisiana (CBS)
DeVonta Smith, Alabama (CBS)
Kadarius Toney, Florida (Athletic)
Avery Williams, Boise State (AFCA, FWAA, Phil Steele, TSN, USAT, WCFF)

See also
 2020 All-ACC football team
 2020 All-Big Ten Conference football team
 2020 All-Big 12 Conference football team
 2020 All-Pac-12 Conference football team
 2020 All-SEC football team
 2020 All-AAC football team
 2020 All-Conference USA football team
 2020 All-MAC football team
 2020 All-Mountain West football team
 2020 All-Sun Belt football team

Footnotes

References
CBS Sports All-America Team
ESPN All-America Team
The Athletic All-America Team
USA Today All-America Team
AP All-America Team
The Sporting News All-America Team
Football Writers' Association of America All-America Team
American Football Coaches Association All-America Team
2020 Walter Camp Football Foundation All-America Team
Phil Steele All-America Team

All-America Team
College Football All-America Teams